From the Inside is the seventh studio album by Italian singer Laura Pausini; it is also her English-language debut album, issued by Atlantic Records on 5 November 2002. To date, it is her only studio album in English.

Background 
Most of the album's 12 tracks fall in the pop genre. Two of the songs, "Love Comes From The Inside" and "I Do 2 Be", are outside pop. Two songs were first released in Italian and Spanish in previous albums It's Not Goodbye and Everyday Is A Monday. The latter was originally written in English and adapted later into Italian and Spanish, though it first released in these languages. Important songwriters appear in the credits of the album, such as Andreas Carlsson, K. C. Porter, and longtime Madonna collaborator Patrick Leonard. The recording company (Atlantic Records) promoted the single Surrender more as a dance song (helped by the several remixes of the song) than a pop song. In this way, Surrender was able to reach No. 1 number one in the Billboard'''s Hot Dance Club Play. The same happened for the second single, "If That's Love". In January 2003, the album was released in Europe, as well.

Despite all Pausini's efforts, the album did not get the success she expected in the United States, where it sold 100,000 copies, according to Nielsen-Soundscan.
Frustrated at the incorrect promotion strategy by Atlantic Records, which promoted the album as a dance album, Pausini asked to have From the Inside promoted to an adult audience. When Atlantic refused, Pausini ceased further promotion in the United States and returned to Italy, leaving From the Inside to the label. The promotion of the album went on in Europe for some months.

In late 2011, songs "For Your Love" and "Kiss Kiss" were fully leaked in the internet. After some polemics, Pausini confirmed that both tracks were demonstration tracks from From the Inside'', but did not make their way into the final cut. Though not confirmed, "Kiss Kiss" is supposed to have been discarded due to it being out of Pausini's style.

Track listing 

Original version

Japanese version

Charts

Weekly charts

Year-end charts

Certifications and sales

Release history

References

2002 albums
Laura Pausini albums
Atlantic Records albums